This is a list of the squads which played the 1974 African Cup of Nations. The 1974 tournament was won by the Zaire national football team.

Group A

Egypt
Trainer: Dettmar Cramer
|

|

Uganda
Trainer: Otto Westhof
|

|

Zambia
Trainer: Ante Buselic
|

|

Cote d'Ivoire
Trainer: Santa Rosa
|

|

Group B

Zaire
Trainer: Blagoje Vidinic
|

|

Guinea
Trainer: László Budai
|  

|

Congo PR

Coach:  Robert Ndoudi

|

|

Mauritius
Trainer: Mohammad Anwar Elahee
|

References

External links

Squads
Africa Cup of Nations squads